The National Archives of Benin are located in capital city Porto-Novo, Benin. The archives were established on March 3, 1914, on the order of Governor William Ponty.

Services 
The Archives provide the following primary services: 
 Bookbinding studio with equipment for document restoration
 Reprography, made available to researchers through its communication service, including 2 photocopy machines
Information services for entry of research instruments and for management of personal recollections, theses, and newspaper card indexes. A microfilm reader is available.

Activities

On November 13, 2014, a training workshop commemorated the Archives' centenary. The theme was the adoption of ISAD (G) and ISAAR (CPF) standards for archival description and the use of open source archive management software.

On April 3, 2020, Médrique Awangonou published a book on the national archives of Dahomey (now the Republic of Benin) from 1914 to 2014 on the topic of Human Sciences.

The archives preserve the actions of the men and women who have contributed to the country's history. The colonial administration created a service for the archives to safeguard administrative documents.

See also 
 Unesco Memory of the World Register – Africa
 National Library of Benin
 List of national archives

References

External links 
 Archives nationales du Bénin:  website

Benin
Porto-Novo
Beninese culture